The 2013–2014 season was the 18th edition of the Lebanese Basketball League. The regular season began on Friday, January 31, 2014, and ended on Saturday April 19, 2014. The playoffs began on Friday, April 25 and ended with the 2014 Finals on Tuesday June 17, 2014, after Riyadi Beirut defeated Sagesse Beirut in 6 games to win their ninth title (new format).

Regular season

Standings

Playoffs

Brackets

Statistics Leaders

Awards 
 Finals MVP: Ismail Ahmad, Riyadi Beirut
 Player of the Year: Dion Dixon, Homenetmen Beirut
 Guard of the Year: Dion Dixon, Homenetmen Beirut
 Forward of the Year: Fadi El Khatib, Amchit Club
 Center of the Year: Hassan Whiteside, Mouttahed Tripoli
 Newcomer of the Year: Dion Dixon, Homenetmen Beirut
 Import of the Year: Dion Dixon, Homenetmen Beirut
 Domestic Player of the Year: Fadi El Khatib, Amchit Club
 Defensive Player of the Year: Jeremiah Massey, Amchit Club
 Coach of the Year: Fouad Abou Chakra, Sagesse Beirut
 First Team:
 PG: Dion Dixon, Homenetmen Beirut
 F/G: Fadi El Khatib, Amchit Club
 F: Jeremiah Massey, Amchit Club
 F/C: Vladan Vukosavljević, Champville SC
 C: Hassan Whiteside, Mouttahed Tripoli
 Second Team:
 PG: Rodrigue Akl, Sagesse Beirut
 G: Corey Williams, Mouttahed Tripoli
 G: Jasmon Youngblood, Byblos Club
 F/C: Ismail Ahmad, Riyadi Beirut
 C: Chris Daniels, Sagesse Beirut

References 
 http://www.asia-basket.com/Lebanon/basketball-Division-A_2013-2014.asp
 http://www.foxsportspulse.com/comp_info.cgi?c=11-9326-0-289979-0&pool=1&a=LADDER

Lebanese Basketball League seasons
League
Lebanese